Mazin Abu Kalal (died May 5, 2013) was an Iraqi politician.

Death
On May 5, 2013, he was killed by a bomb.

References

2013 deaths
Iraqi politicians
Year of birth missing
Deaths by improvised explosive device in Iraq